North Expressway may refer to:

 North Luzon Expressway in the Philippines
 North Wales Expressway or A55 road in Wales and England